El Aguilar is a company mining town and municipality in Jujuy Province in Argentina. It has 3655 inhabitants (2001 census).

Climate
El Aguilar has an alpine climate (Köppen ETH) with two distinct seasons. There is a relatively mild wet season from December to March and a bone-dry dry season with frigid mornings from April to November.

References

Populated places in Jujuy Province